Rita Medrano Muñoz (born 26 January 1990) is a Mexican competition swimmer.  At the 2012 Summer Olympics in London, she competed in the women's 200-metre butterfly, finishing in 23rd place overall in the heats, failing to qualify for the semifinals.

References

1990 births
Living people
Female butterfly swimmers
Mexican female swimmers
Sportspeople from Aguascalientes
People from Aguascalientes City
Olympic swimmers of Mexico
Swimmers at the 2012 Summer Olympics
Texas A&M Aggies women's swimmers
Swimmers at the 2011 Pan American Games
Pan American Games bronze medalists for Mexico
Pan American Games medalists in swimming
Central American and Caribbean Games gold medalists for Mexico
Central American and Caribbean Games medalists in swimming
Competitors at the 2010 Central American and Caribbean Games
Medalists at the 2011 Pan American Games
21st-century Mexican women